The following tables indicate the historic party affiliation of elected officials in the U.S. state of Wisconsin, including: Governor, Lieutenant Governor, Secretary of State, Attorney General, State Treasurer, Superintendent of Public Instruction. The tables also indicate the historical party composition in the State Senate, State Assembly, the State delegation to the United States Senate, and the State delegation to the United States House of Representatives. For years in which a United States presidential election was held, the tables indicate which party's nominees received the state's electoral votes.

1848–1899

1900–1949

1950–1999

2000–present

References

See also
List of Superintendents of Public Instruction of Wisconsin
Politics in Wisconsin
Elections in Wisconsin

Politics of Wisconsin
Government of Wisconsin
Wisconsin